Savaana FC is a Somali football club based in Mogadishu, Somalia which currently plays in Somalia League.

The team plays in yellow and blue kits.

Stadium
Currently the team plays at the 15,000 capacity Banadir Stadium.

References

External links
 Soccerway
 Somsoccer

Football clubs in Somalia
Sport in Mogadishu